The Second Kejriwal cabinet is the Council of Minister in Delhi Legislative Assembly headed by Chief Minister Arvind Kejriwal.

Chief Minister & Cabinet Ministers
Here is the list of ministers:

Former Members

Major work

Mohalla Clinic 
Aam Aadmi Mohalla Clinics (AAMC) were started in every neighbourhood for providing free medical care. The scheme has received international acclaim.

Jai Bheem Mukhyamantri Pratiba Vikas Yojana 
As minister Rajendra Pal Gautam held the charge of social welfare department in the  Second Kejriwal ministry. Under his charge Jai Bheem Mukhyamantri Pratiba Vikas Yojana was started. Indian Express noted it as one of Arvind Kejriwal government's most ambitious programmes. In this program, free coaching is provided to children from the Scheduled Castes and Scheduled Tribes to prepare them for IIT JEE, NEET and other competitive exams. When the program started about 4,900 students enrolled for the free coaching classes. in 2022, around 15,000 are enrolled in various courses under this scheme.

See also
 Sixth Legislative Assembly of Delhi
 Third Kejriwal cabinet

References

External links
Council of Ministers

Cabinets established in 2015
2015 establishments in Delhi
Delhi cabinets
Kejriwal government
Kejriwal
2020 disestablishments in India